Mantaray is the debut solo album by English singer Siouxsie. It was released in September 2007 by W14 Music on Universal Records, four years after the final album of the Creatures, Hái!. After her first solo tour in 2004, Siouxsie wanted to collaborate with other musicians. She met Steve Evans and Charlie Jones, both of them arranged the songs and produced the record. Upon release, Mantaray was well received by critics, with praise focused on Siouxsie's voice and the different compositional styles.

In May 2023, a newly remastered version of Mantaray  will be reissued on CD through Siouxsie's official website.

Background
After the success of her first solo release, the live DVD Dreamshow, which reached the No. 1 position in the UK chart in August 2005, Siouxsie received demos from several composers. Universal soon offered her a new record deal on the label W14, which was about to be created by John Williams - Williams had already previously worked with her for Peepshow and Boomerang. Commenting on the news on her website in July 2006, Siouxsie stated, "At least I didn't have to get someone spray-painting my name on the front of the Universal building"! It was a reference to a famous episode which took place in early 1978 in London when record companies had been tagged one morning with the command, "Sign the Banshees, do it now".

Recording and music
Mantaray was co-produced by Steve Evans (who had previously worked with Robert Plant) and Charlie Jones (who had collaborated with Plant as well as with Goldfrapp). The drums were performed by Clive Deamer, who had previously played with both Plant, and Portishead. Evans and Jones together composed the music for the tracks "About to Happen", "If It Doesn't Kill You", "Sea of Tranquility", "They Follow You" and "Heaven and Alchemy". She worked in a different environment with a touch of fear as she didn't know what to expect.

It was the first time that Siouxsie worked with producers who also physically played on the record, which made a "huge difference". Instead of recording the album in one block session, she commuted from France to Bath in England where was located the producers' studio. She made several trips from the end of 2006 to May 2007, concentrating on two or three tracks at the time. This working method provided a useful overview, as she stated: "Sometimes when you're so involved in a project day in day out, you can lose sight of the goal or the object. It puts a different discipline to it". She used technology as a tool, listening to the recording process of the music from home. Siouxsie's only instruction to her two composers was "to treat every song as a potential single".

Mantaray includes a variety of musical styles, including pop, glam and cabaret. She said: "it has probably got the Siouxsie from seven years old to now, a life painting of where I started and where I am up to now". "If it Doesn't Kill You" was one of the oldest lyrics she wrote, and the original music was different before she first met Jones. He was drawn to the title and in Siouxsie's words, "he made it one of those classic songs that could be associated with James Bond. It's quite cinematic." "Sea of Tranquility" existed as a lyric on its own and was her idea of writing a sci-fi murder mystery. Jones and Evans "took it somewhere with that whole bossa nova thing" and the title of the album comes from a line of it. A manta ray is described as "a ghost of a roar from the sea floor" in that song. In an interview for The Telegraph, she further explained: "Because the sounds on the album are so diverse, we needed an abstract title. Rays symbolise something from deep space and a long, long time ago." "The deep ocean also inspired [1964 TV series] Stingray and science fiction. Which takes us on to space - those wings. Deep ocean and space are almost reversible worlds."

Release and promotion
Mantaray was released in the UK on 10 September 2007 on W14 Music, a Universal Music Group sublabel. A U.S. release followed on 2 October on Decca Records. In addition to the standard jewel case and a tri-fold Digipak, Mantaray was also released on vinyl in both countries. The album was preceded by its first single, "Into a Swan", released one week earlier on 3 September. Upon release, Mantaray hit No. 39 in the UK Albums Chart.

"Here Comes That Day" was released as second single on 29 October and was followed by the album's third and last single, "About to Happen", on 10 March 2008. Mantaray was supported by a year long world tour and TV appearances. The last show of the tour was filmed and released on the Finale: The Last Mantaray & More Show DVD in 2009.

In 2022, Mantaray was remastered at Abbey Road Studios to mark its 15th anniversary. The remastered version features different artwork and was released on streaming and download platforms in December with a vinyl and CD reissue coming in May 2023.

Critical reception

Mantaray received positive reviews from music critics. Nitsuh Abebe of Pitchfork wrote, "She really is pop" before finishing the review with the declaration, "It's a success". Concerning the quality of the songs, journalist Charlotte Heathcote noted, "Impressively, there's not a let-down track on the album and a perfectionist attention to detail sees synths, strings, wind and percussion used to creative, compelling effect". Mojo also praised the songs and the arrangements, saying that "a thirst for sonic adventure radiates from each track". Simon Price in The Independent shared the same point of view, stating that "Mantaray is a bracing and beautiful blast of ice". In a review rated 4 stars out of 5, The Times observed that her "steely-toned voice is as beguiling as ever". Similarly, The Telegraph critic Andrew Perry noted, "She sounds imperious, passionate". Qs Gary Mulholland published a positive review and said, "Siouxsie voice is as rich and sensual as ever, and lyrical references to rebirth abound". Uncut wrote, "Fortunately [...] she's still the uncompromising outsider at heart". In a review rated 4 out of 5 stars, Metro commented that the 10 songs of her first solo album "do add further depth to her repertoire". Slant Magazine qualified Mantaray's sound as "distinctly modern", stating that "it's Siouxsie voice—trembling and echoing all at once—that reaffirms the album's urgency".

Track listing

Personnel
 Siouxsie Sioux — vocals
 Steve Evans — guitar, programming, ukulele
 Charlie Jones — bass, upright bass, Rhodes piano, synths, piano, autoharp
 Clive Deamer — drums
 Hossam Ramzy — percussion
 Ken Dewar — percussion
 Noko — guitars, keyboards, programming
 Phil Andrews — guitar, keyboards, programming
 Terry Edwards — saxophone, trumpet, flugelhorn
 Ted Benham — hammered dulcimer, xylophone
 Davide Rossi — strings
 Tom Dalgety — engineer

Notes
1 Kim Hoglund

Charts

References

2007 debut albums
Universal Records albums
Siouxsie Sioux albums